The 2002 Northern Chile floods and mudflow were a series of flash floods and mudflows that affected north-central Chile in early June 2002. The floods and mudflows were the result of heavy rains in the area. Overall 17 human casualties can be attributed to the rainfalls. Among the casualties, there were twelve direct deaths, four indirect deaths and one disappearance. The Locality of Los Molles was particularly badly affected.

According to National Office of Emergency of the Interior Ministry (ONEMI) 71 and 347 houses were destroyed in Coquimbo and Valparaíso regions respectively.

See also
1991 Antofagasta mudflows
2015 Northern Chile floods and mudflow
2016–17 South American floods

References

2002 floods in South America
Floods in Chile
2002 in Chile
2002 meteorology
2002 Northern Chile floods
Landslides in 2002
2002 Northern Chile
2002 Northern Chile
Northern Chile floods and mudflow
Weather events in Chile
Presidency of Ricardo Lagos
2002 disasters in Chile